Hungary competed at the 2002 Winter Olympics in Salt Lake City, United States.

Alpine skiing

Men

Women

Biathlon

Men

Women

 1 A penalty loop of 150 metres had to be skied per missed target. 
 3 One minute added per missed target.

Bobsleigh

Men

Women

Cross-country skiing

Men
Sprint

Pursuit

 1 Starting delay based on 10 km C. results. 
 C = Classical style, F = Freestyle

Women
Sprint

Pursuit

 2 Starting delay based on 5 km C. results. 
 C = Classical style, F = Freestyle

Figure skating

Men

Women

Short track speed skating

Men

Women

Speed skating

Men

Women

References
Official Olympic Reports
International Olympic Committee results database
 Olympic Winter Games 2002, full results by sports-reference.com

O
Nations at the 2002 Winter Olympics
2002